Dischista is a genus of beetles in the family Cetoniidae. It was first described in 1842.

Species 
The following species are accepted within the genus Dischista:

 Dischista bouyeri Beinhundner, 2006
 Dischista cincta (Degeer, 1778)
 Dischista cincta cincta (Degeer, 1778)
 Dischista cincta werneri Beinhundner, 1998
 Dischista cuneata (Klug, 1855)
 Dischista ewerti (Schürhoff, 1935)
 Dischista impunctata (Lansberge, 1886)
 Dischista impunctata mpunctata (Lansberge, 1886)
 Dischista impunctata seynaevei (Basilewsky, 1955)
 Dischista legrandi Antoine, 2004
 Dischista lerui Antoine, 2004
 Dischista lizleri Beinhundner, 1998
 Dischista rojkoffi Antoine, 2010
 Dischista rufa (De Geer, 1778)
 Dischista staudingeri (Bourgoin, 1930)

References 

Beetles described in 1842
Beetles of Africa
Cetoniinae